Tsigov Chark is a  ski resort  in the  western Rhodope Mountains of Bulgaria. It is located at 900–1000 metres above sea level, and is located 8 kilometres from the town of Batak and 24 kilometres east of Velingrad. The resort is situated near Batak Reservoir.

References
Bulgariaski.com

Ski areas and resorts in Bulgaria
Geography of Pazardzhik Province
Tourist attractions in Pazardzhik Province